The Last Act is a 2012 Indian Hindi-language anthology film directed by twelve directors and written by Anurag Kashyap.

Segments 
The twelve segments include:
Tathagata Singha's Calcutta 
Anurag Goswami's Lucknow
Himanshu Tyagi's Gwalior
Varun Choudhury's Chandigarh
Jagannathan Krishnan's Pune
Nijo-Rohit's Delhi
Tejas Joshi's Kalyan
Nitye Sood's Bangalore

Cast 
Saurabh Shukla as theatre troupe director

Production 
Twelve different short stories were connected by Anurag Kashyap, who wrote the film's screenplay. Each of the short films are ten minutes long and take place in twelve different cities. The twelve directors were chosen by Kashyap, Sudhir Mishra, and Chakri Toleti.

Release 
The film was screened at Mumbai on 12 December 2012. The Times of India gave the film a rating of three-and-a-half out of five stars and wrote that "With a unique concept at hand and an all-new directors’ gang, getting the ‘act together’ is no mean feat. Team of 12 – Take a bow, this stage is all yours". Firstpost wrote that "One hopes the collaborative form will find more takers in India—perhaps the next time round, the ride will be a smoother one".

References

External links 

2012 films
Indian independent films
2010s Hindi-language films
Indian anthology films
2012 independent films